Kwame Bonsu (born 25 September 1994) is a Ghanaian footballer who plays as a midfielder for Espérance Sportive de Tunis.He has had previous spells in Sweden with  Gefle IF, Mjällby AIF, Rosengård  and for Asante Kotoko in his home country Ghana.

Club career

Youth Career (Heart of Lions) 
At the age of 17 he got a contract to play for the Ghanaian premier league team Heart of Lions in the 2012/13 season By the end of the season he had played 22 games and scored 4 goals for the Ghanaian premier club.

Career in Sweden 
In 2013 whilst playing for  Heart of Lions based in Kpando, Kwame secured a loan deal to play in Sweden for Malmo team FC Rosengard. He played eight league matches and scored two goals for Rosengård both goals were scored on 7 September 2013 in a 2–1 win over Hässleholms IF.

His performances for Heart of Lions secured him permanent contract to play for Mjallby AIF in the 2014/15 season. Bonsu played a total of 39 matches scoring two goals for Mjällby AIF He then signed a 3-year contract with Gefle IF in July 2015 after leaving Mjällby AIF.  He played 42 league matches between 2015 and 2017 until the sadden career-threatening incident happened to him where he was accused of assaulting his then wife Maria Magnusson.

Asante Kotoko 
The former IF Gafle midfielder moved back to Ghana to join Asante Kotoko in October 2018 after serving a jail sentence of 1year 10months for sexually assaulting his wife in Sweden. He played a key role in the team impressive run in the CAF Confederation Cup as they progressed to the group stages of the cup for the first time in 11years and also helped the club to win the Normalization Committee Tier one cup.

Espérance Sportive de Tunis 
Due to his brilliant performance for Asante Kotoko in the CAF Confederation 2019 Competition he secured a move to Tunisian League giants Espérance Sportive de Tunis July 2019.

He played in 15 matches out of 26 matches of which he started 14 matches as Espérance ST won the 2019–20 Tunisian Ligue

International
He made his debut for the Ghana national football team on 26 March 2019 in a friendly against Mauritania.

Honours

Club 

 Espérance de Tunis

 Tunisian Ligue Professionnelle 1 (1): 2019–20
 Tunisian Super Cup (1): 2020

References

External links

 https://www.cafonline.com/news-center/news/free-from-captivity-bonsu-steering-kotoko-wheel

1994 births
Living people
Association football midfielders
Ghanaian footballers
Ghanaian expatriate footballers
Ghana international footballers
Allsvenskan players
Superettan players
Tunisian Ligue Professionnelle 1 players
Mjällby AIF players
Gefle IF players
Heart of Lions F.C. players
FC Rosengård 1917 players
Asante Kotoko S.C. players
Espérance Sportive de Tunis players
Ghanaian expatriate sportspeople in Sweden
Ghanaian expatriate sportspeople in Tunisia
Expatriate footballers in Sweden
Expatriate footballers in Tunisia